Bertho is a surname. Notable people with the surname include:

Surname

Alain Bertho ( 1991–2009), French anthropologist and academic
Jean Berthollier (1928–2023), French actor and film director known by the stage name Jean Bertho

See also
Bertho Driever (born 1953), Dutch baroque musician and recorder player